Podocampa is a genus of two-pronged bristletails in the family Campodeidae. There are about 18 described species in Podocampa.

Species
These 18 species belong to the genus Podocampa:

 Podocampa bottimeri Conde and Geeraert, 1962 i c g
 Podocampa brolemanni Denis, 1932 g
 Podocampa cardini Silvestri, 1932 g
 Podocampa ceballosi Silvestri, 1932 g
 Podocampa cerrutii Conde, 1975 g
 Podocampa confinis Conde and Geeraert, 1962 i c g
 Podocampa fragiliformis Conde, 1954 g
 Podocampa fragiloides Silvestri, 1932 g
 Podocampa iglesiasi Silvestri, 1932 g
 Podocampa inveterata Allen, 1993 i c g
 Podocampa jeanneli Condé, 1947 g
 Podocampa jorgei Wygodzinski, 1944 g
 Podocampa labeosa Conde and Geeraert, 1962 i c g
 Podocampa moroderi Silvestri, 1932 g
 Podocampa seabrai Wygodzinski, 1944 g
 Podocampa simonini Conde, 1956 g
 Podocampa spenceri (Silvestri, 1933) i c g
 Podocampa vicina Conde and Geeraert, 1962 i c g

Data sources: i = ITIS, c = Catalogue of Life, g = GBIF, b = Bugguide.net

References

Further reading

 
 
 

Diplura